Olympic class  may refer to:
Racing shell, an Olympic class boat raced at the Summer Olympics, also known as a fine boat
Olympic sailing classes, a class of sail boats currently raced in the Summer Olympic sailing program as well as boat varieties formerly raced
Olympic class ocean liner, a trio of ocean liners built in the early 20th century, which are the RMS Olympic, the RMS Titanic, and the HMHS Britannic
Olympics Class (submarine), a Chinese submarine